Prince Aditya Dibabha (27 July 1900 – 19 May 1946) was a member of the Thai Royal Family and a Siamese political figure. He served as Chairman of the Regency Council between the years 1935 and 1944, as King Ananda Mahidol was still a minor.

Biography
Aditya Dibabha was the son of Prince Abhakara Kiartivongse and Princess Dibyasambandh. He born on 27 July 1900 with the first name born Mom Chao Aditya Dibabha. He was married to Kobkaew Wisetkul maid of honor of Queen Rambai Barni on 5 January 1929 they did not have a successor. He died of cancer on 19 May 1946, aged 45.

Military rank
 1943 Lieutenant General, Vice Admiral and Air Marshal

References

Thai male Phra Ong Chao
Abhakara family
Regents of Thailand
Knights of the Ratana Varabhorn Order of Merit
Knights Grand Cross of the Order of Chula Chom Klao
Knights Grand Cross of the Royal Victorian Order
1900 births
1946 deaths
Thai military personnel
Royal Thai Army personnel
Thai generals
Royal Thai Navy personnel
Thai admirals
Royal Thai Air Force personnel
Royal Thai Air Force air marshals
Thai male Mom Chao
19th-century Chakri dynasty
20th-century Chakri dynasty